Hedong Airport railway station (Chinese: 河东机场站) is a railway station in Lingwu, Yinchuan, Ningxia. It is an underground station which serves Yinchuan Hedong International Airport.

History
The station was opened on 29 December 2019 with the first stage of the Yinchuan–Lanzhou high-speed railway.

References

Railway stations in Ningxia
Railway stations opened in 2019
Airport railway stations in China